Bernhard Bauknecht (March 31, 1900 – October 23, 1985) was a German farmer and politician of the Christian Democratic Union (CDU) and former member of the German Bundestag.

Life 
From 1946 to 1952 Bauknecht was a member of the Advisory State Assembly and then of the State Parliament for Württemberg-Hohenzollern. In the state parliament he headed the committee for food and agriculture. From 1949 to 1969 he was a member of the German Bundestag. There he represented the constituency of Biberach. From 1953 to 1969 he was Chairman of the Bundestag Committee for Food, Agriculture and Forestry.

In the 1949 Bundestag elections he achieved the best first-past-the-post result ever achieved in a constituency, with 82% of the votes cast.

Literature

References

1900 births
1985 deaths
Members of the Bundestag for Baden-Württemberg
Members of the Bundestag 1965–1969
Members of the Bundestag 1961–1965
Members of the Bundestag 1957–1961
Members of the Bundestag 1953–1957
Members of the Bundestag 1949–1953
Members of the Bundestag for the Christian Democratic Union of Germany
Members of the Landtag of Baden-Württemberg
German farmers
Recipients of the Order of Merit of Baden-Württemberg
Grand Crosses with Star and Sash of the Order of Merit of the Federal Republic of Germany